Danny Arnold (born 15 April 1977) is a former Scotland international rugby league footballer who played as a  or  in the 1990s and 2000s. He played at club level for St Helens (Heritage No. 1060), Huddersfield Giants, Castleford Tigers (Heritage No. 768), Salford City Reds and Halifax.

Background
Arnold was born in Warrington, Cheshire, England.

Playing career
Arnold was signed by St. Helens from amateur club Wigan St Judes on 15 April 1994 and made his début on 10 September 1995 against Workington Town.

One of the most memorable moments of Arnold's career was the hat-trick he scored against Wigan Warriors at Knowsley Road in 1996 where St Helens ran out 42–26 winners. Arnold also played for St Helens on the wing in the 1996 Challenge Cup Final at Wembley Stadium, London, scoring a try in each half of the match, helping his team to a 40–32 victory against Bradford Bulls.

During his time at St Helens, Arnold won two Challenge Cup final winners' medals (1996 and 1997), both finals against Bradford Bulls. He was also part of Saints' Championship winning side of 1996.

Arnold was a Scotland international and played at the 2000 Rugby League World Cup. He made nine appearances for the team between 1998 and 2003, scoring eight tries.

He currently plays Rugby Union for Aspull RUFC and is set to gain another international cap for the Aspull club in Warsaw, Poland.

Danny took part in a 10s rugby tournament on 4 June for 'A Soldiers Journey'. He masterminded a team of young emus to the final as they won all their matches and went on to win the final in tough conditions.

References

External links
Saints Heritage Society profile

The Teams: Scotland

1977 births
Living people
Castleford Tigers players
English people of Scottish descent
English rugby league players
Halifax R.L.F.C. players
Huddersfield Giants players
Rugby league centres
Rugby league fullbacks
Rugby league players from Warrington
Rugby league wingers
Salford Red Devils players
Scotland national rugby league team players
St Helens R.F.C. players